John Kirk VC (July 1827 – 31 August 1865) was an English soldier in the British Army who served in the Second Anglo-Sikh War and the Indian Mutiny. He is notable as a recipient of the Victoria Cross, the highest and most prestigious award for gallantry in the face of the enemy that can be awarded to British and Commonwealth forces.

Details
Kirk was approximately 29 years old, and a private in the 10th Regiment of Foot (later The Lincolnshire Regiment), British Army during the Indian Mutiny when the following deed on 4 June 1857 at Benares, India led to the award of the Victoria Cross to him, Peter Gill and Matthew Rosamund:

John Kirk died of tuberculosis on 31 August 1865. He is buried in Anfield Cemetery, Liverpool.

The Medal
His Victoria Cross is displayed at the Museum of Lincolnshire Life, in Lincoln, England.

See also
Peter Gill
Matthew Rosamund

References

Location of grave and VC medal
 
Liverpool VCs (James Murphy, Pen and Sword Books, 2008)

1827 births
1865 deaths
19th-century deaths from tuberculosis
British recipients of the Victoria Cross
Royal Lincolnshire Regiment soldiers
Indian Rebellion of 1857 recipients of the Victoria Cross
Victoria Cross awardees from Liverpool
British military personnel of the Second Anglo-Sikh War
British Army recipients of the Victoria Cross
Burials at Anfield Cemetery
Tuberculosis deaths in England